Gynnidomorpha rubricana is a species of moth of the family Tortricidae first described by Henri de Peyerimhoff in 1877. It is found in China (Jilin), Korea and Europe, where it has been recorded from Spain, France, Italy and Croatia.

The wingspan is 11–13 mm. Adults are on wing from May to July.

References

Moths described in 1877
Cochylini